Chloronitrobenzene may refer to:

 2-Chloronitrobenzene
 3-Chloronitrobenzene
 4-Chloronitrobenzene